Judit Kéri-Novák (21 January 1950 – July 2000) was a Hungarian rower. She competed at the 1976 Summer Olympics and the 1980 Summer Olympics.

References

1950 births
2000 deaths
Hungarian female rowers
Olympic rowers of Hungary
Rowers at the 1976 Summer Olympics
Rowers at the 1980 Summer Olympics
Rowers from Budapest
20th-century Hungarian women